Badal is a station on line 5 of the Barcelona Metro.

The station is located underneath Carrer de Sants, between Carrer Arizala and Carrer Sant Feliu de Guíxols. It was opened in 1969.

The side-platform station has a ticket hall on either end, the western one with two accesses at Carrer Arizala and Carrer Carreras Candi, the eastern one with one access at Carrer de Sants.

Services

External links
 Badal at Trenscat.com

Railway stations in Spain opened in 1969
Barcelona Metro line 5 stations